Mustapha Oussalah (born 19 February 1982) is a former professional footballer who played as a midfielder. Born in Belgium, Oussalah represented Morocco internationally.

Career
Born in Liège, Oussalah started in January 2009 as a central midfielder for KV Kortrijk, after being transferred from Excelsior Moeskroen. In his youth, he played at Tilleur-Liégeois and RFC Seraing. Before the 2014–15 season, he moved, together with his coach Hein Vanhaezebrouck of KV Kortrijk, to KAA Gent.

References

External links
 Club bio
 

1982 births
Moroccan footballers
Morocco international footballers
Belgian footballers
Belgian sportspeople of Moroccan descent
Belgian Pro League players
K.A.A. Gent players
K.A.S. Eupen players
K.V. Kortrijk players
Living people
Royal Excel Mouscron players
Footballers from Liège
Standard Liège players
Association football midfielders